Flying the Corporate Jet is an album by American alternative rock band Nine Days. It is their sixth studio album, and was released on their own label, Dirty Poet Records, in 2003.

Track listing
All songs written by John Hampson and Brian Desveaux
 29 Year Old Girls - 4:15
 Goodbye - 4:12
 Wonderful - 3:08
 Something Has Gone Wrong - 3:29
 Reality TV - 3:22
 Devil You Know - 5:54
 Catch Me If You Can - 3:32
 The Moment - 4:16
 17 and 33 - 3:53

Personnel
Adapted via Discogs.

Nine Days
 John Hampson – vocals, guitar
 Brian Desveaux – guitar, vocals, harmonica, mandolin
 Nick Dimichino – bass
 Jeremy Dean - organ  (tracks: 3, 9)
 John Miceli - drums 

Additional Personnel
Dave McNair - percussion 
Charlie Drannbauer - guitar (tracks: 1, 4)

Production
 Nine Days - Producer, Engineer, Mixing

References

2003 albums
Nine Days albums